Robin Huntington Lee (December 2, 1919 in Saint Paul, Minnesota – October 8, 1997 in Minneapolis) was an American figure skater.  He was the 1935-1939 U.S. national champion. At age 12, he became the youngest skater to win the junior national title. At the 1935 United States Figure Skating Championships, at the age of 15, he became the first and, as of 2008, the only skater to defeat a seven time national champion in the United States.

Lee represented the United States at the 1936 Winter Olympics, where he placed 12th. He was selected to compete at the 1940 Winter Olympics, which were canceled due to World War II. During the War, Lee served in the U.S. Navy. After the War, Lee skated professionally in ice shows and worked as a coach.

Lee was inducted into the U.S. Figure Skating Hall of Fame in 1995. He attended Erasmus Hall High School.

The Robin Lee Midwest Open is a USFS sanctioned competition held each year in the summer by Lee's home club, the Figure Skating Club of Minneapolis, named in his honor.

Competitive highlights

References

   
 Hall of Fame Inductees
  
 Sports-reference profile

Figure skaters at the 1936 Winter Olympics
Olympic figure skaters of the United States
American male single skaters
1919 births
1997 deaths
Sportspeople from Saint Paul, Minnesota
20th-century American people